Arthur Benjamin Aragon (November 13, 1927 – March 25, 2008) was an American boxer in the lightweight class from New Mexico.

Early and later life
Aragon was a native of Belen, New Mexico, but grew up in East Los Angeles. His family was of Mexican descent. He was married four times and engaged a fifth time. He had six acknowledged children. After retiring from boxing, Aragon went into the bail bonds business and pursued acting roles. He converted to Judaism later in life and is buried in a Jewish cemetery in Los Angeles.

Professional boxing career
Aragon's first professional fight, a points win in May 1944, was against Frenchy Rene at the Olympic Auditorium in Los Angeles. Aragon won his first eleven fights before dropping a decision to Bert White in October 1944. Aragon faced ever-tougher competition as his career progressed, eventually facing many of the great names from his era, including Tommy Campbell, Jesse Flores, Redtop Davis, Jimmy Carter and Carmen Basilio. Aragon also held victories over such men as Enrique Bolanos, Johnny Gonsalves, future lightweight champion Lauro Salas, future welterweight champion Don Jordan, Danny Giovanelli and Chico Vejar. In 1951, he defeated lightweight champion Jimmy Carter in a non-title bout. Three months later he lost a rematch to Carter for the title in a bout in which he reportedly struggled to make weight. He defeated Carter once again five years later after Carter had been dethroned. Aragon retired in 1960 with a career record of 90 wins (61 by knockout), 20 losses, and 6 draws. Before his career ended, Aragon was dogged by accusations of conspiring to fix fights in his favor, including a conviction in California in February 1957. Similar allegations were made by other fighters afterwards but were never substantiated.

Career in Hollywood
Aragon enjoyed popularity among Hollywood circles. He was romantically linked to Marilyn Monroe, Jayne Mansfield and other Hollywood starlets of the era. Another Hollywood connection was Aragon's friendship with World War II hero turned Western star Audie Murphy. He had various film and television credits between the 1950s and 1970s, including appearances as himself in the boxing films The Ring and Off Limits, and he played the role of Private Sanchez in the 1955 war film To Hell and Back. He can be heard as a contestant on the 24th May 1950 radio episode of You Bet Your Life.

Filmography

References

External links

 
 

1927 births
2008 deaths
American boxers of Mexican descent
Boxers from New Mexico
People from Belen, New Mexico
Boxers from Los Angeles
Burials at Mount Sinai Memorial Park Cemetery
American male boxers
Jewish American boxers
Converts to Judaism
People from East Los Angeles, California
Lightweight boxers
20th-century American Jews
21st-century American Jews